Movistar Fútbol was a paid Spanish television channel owned by Telefónica, which broadcast matches from two of the five major European leagues: Serie A and Ligue 1. It was available exclusively on Movistar+, and had two other auxiliary signals (Movistar Fútbol 1-2), for matches played simultaneously.

History 
The channel began broadcasting on February 1, 2007, replacing "Canal + Deportes 1". The channel was dedicated exclusively to football, and began broadcasting matches of some of the major, as well as qualifying, matches for the final stages of UEFA selections. On 1 August 2016 the channel was renamed "Movistar Fútbol". The substitution of the Canal+ brand was framed within the transition in the visual identity of the channels of the Movistar+ platform.

On 9 August 2018 the channel became exclusive for the non-residential clients of the platform, as a replica of the contents broadcast by the Movistar Liga de Campeones channel for individuals. Mid-season 2018/19, on 7 March 2019, the channel returned to individuals, to cover the Ligue 1 of France and the Italian Serie A, after having acquired the rights of the same to Mediapro. Finally in mid-April 2019, the channel stopped broadcasting disappearing weeks later on IPTV and on 10 May 2019 on satellite, moving its content to #Vamos and Movistar Liga de Campeones and its auxiliary signals. Movistar Fútbol was closed officially on 7 August 2019.

References

External links
Official site

Movistar+
Television stations in Spain
Television channels and stations established in 2003
Association football on television
Sports television in Spain
2003 establishments in Spain
Football in Spain